John Wesley Edward Bowen III (October 2, 1926 – May 27, 2011) was a Republican politician who, in 1966 became the first African American elected to the Ohio Senate from Franklin County.

Biography

Early life and education

John W.E. Bowen III was born on October 4, 1926 in Jackson, Mississippi, to the Reverend John W.E. Bowen, Jr. and Margaret Davis Bowen.  He is the paternal grandson of John W.E. Bowen, Sr., former President of Gammon Theological Seminary in Atlanta, Georgia and Ariel Serena Hedges Bowen, former Professor of Music at Clark College in Atlanta.

He attended elementary schools in Cincinnati, Ohio and New Orleans, Louisiana, and graduated from Gilbert Academy High School, of New Orleans, Louisiana in 1943.  He attended Lincoln University (Pennsylvania), in Oxford, Pennsylvania, for two years, where he was initiated into Alpha Phi Alpha fraternity.

His college studies were interrupted in June, 1945, when he was drafted into The United States Army, where He qualified as a sharpshooter, and was trained as a combat engineer, a surveyor, and subsequently served as an information and education specialist.

He received an honorable discharge in 1946 and resumed his academic studies for two years at the University of Southern California.  While attending U.S.C., he was a member of the 1947–48 and 1948-49 Track and Field Teams where he was coached by Dean Cromwell and Jess Hill.

He received an L.L.B. from The Ohio State University School of Law in 1953 and began his legal career in the Columbus, Ohio City Attorney's Office where he served as an Assistant City Attorney, Senior Assistant City Attorney, Chief Counsel of the Office's Civil Division, and First Assistant City Attorney.   After leaving the office of the City Attorney, he engaged in the full-time private law practice for over 50 years.

Ohio Senate

Bowen initially ran for the Ohio Senate in 1966, following the Voting Rights Act of 1965.  Opposed by Jerry O'Shaughnessy, Bowen ultimately won the race by only 240 votes. With his victory, he was the first African American elected as a legislator from Franklin County.

He was a member of the Ohio Senate, serving in the 107th and 108th General Assemblies from 1967 through 1970. During his four years in the senate, more than 17 bills he introduced became law in the areas of insurance, child day care, housing, credit unions, commercial law and criminal law.  His tiebreaking vote in committee gave Ohio permanent daylight saving time.

In 1970, Bowen was up for reelection, and O'Shaughnessy opted for a rematch.  However, this time, Bowen was defeated, limiting his time as a legislator to one term, or four years.

Later career
After serving in the Ohio Senate, he became a Director of the Federal Home Loan Bank of Cincinnati, Ohio from 1972 through 1978 and served as chairman of its board of directors from 1975 through 1977; a member of the Ohio Board of Regents from 1978 through 1982; a member of the Board of Directors of the Columbus Area Chamber of Commerce from 1978 through 1983, and served as a Vice Chairman of the Board from 1981 through 1983; and was a Trustee of the Ohio Center Company for Community Urban Redevelopment from 1983 through 1986.

He was one of 100 graduates to be awarded The Ohio State University Centennial Achievement Award in 1970, and was awarded an Honorary Doctor of Laws Degree by Ohio Northern University in Ada, Ohio in 1971.

The John W.E. Bowen III Memorial Roadway in Columbus, Ohio is named in his memory.

References

Further reading
13 Candidates Seek 6 Ohio Senate Nominations in Franklin Co. Districts in May 3 Elections (Personal Profiles), Columbus Dispatch, May 1, 1966, page 2D
Official Franklin County Board of Elections Count Has John W.E. bowen Defeating Jerry O'Shaughnessy For 15th District Ohio Senate Seat by 204 Votes, Reversing An Earlier Count, Columbus Dispatch, November 18, 1966, page 1A
A Recount Of The Official Tally In The Election O 11/8/66 For The 15th Senate Seat Shows Republican John W.E. Bowen Still the Winner, Columbus Dispatch, December 2, 1966, page 11A
FR CO Legislator John W.E. Bowen, To Submit Bill Requiring Compulsory Liability Insurance For All Ohio Motorists, Columbus, Dispatch, January 5, 1967, page 1A
State Sen. John Bowen, R-Columbus, Introduces A Garnishment Reform Bill To Be Considered By The 1970 Session of the General Assembly (Provisions Listed), Columbus, Dispatch, December 22, 1969, page 1A
Ronald Sedgewick, One of Two City Council Republicans, Plans To Nominate John W.E. Bowen For Empty Seat, Columbus, Dispatch, November 9, 1970, page 17A
Bowen, Kropp Named Officers of Home Loan Bank Board, Columbus Dispatch, March 21, 1975, p. B-7
John W.E. Bowen Replaces Gibbs on Ohio Center Board, Call and Post (Columbus, Ohio Edition), November 6, 1982, p. 5A
Regent Appointed, Columbus Citizen Journal, October 20, 1978, p. 6
Two Regents Named:  One Vacancy Remains, The Ohio State Lantern, October 24, 1978, p. 8
Defense Attorney John W.E. Bowen Is A "Polished Pro", Columbus, Dispatch, August 21, 1983, p. 2B
Advocate Profile, Bowen Has Championed Many Causes, The Daily Reporter, Columbus, Ohio, November, 1984
Boule Journal, Volume 75, Number 4, Winter 2011, Page 110,  http://www.sigmapiphi.org/home/flying-on-the-wings-of-heroes.php
Ohio Board of Regents, Past Regents, http://www.ohiohighered.org/node/330
African American Legislators, http://www.georgewashingtonwilliams.org/Legislators.aspx?letter=B&publicOfficialId=10053
Obituary, http://www.legacy.com/obituaries/dispatch/obituary.aspx?n=john-w-e-bowen&pid=151341470&fhid=8663#fbLoggedOut

Republican Party Ohio state senators
Politicians from Columbus, Ohio
Politicians from Jackson, Mississippi
Military personnel from Mississippi
Lawyers from Columbus, Ohio
Lincoln University (Pennsylvania) alumni
1926 births
2011 deaths
Ohio State University Moritz College of Law alumni
20th-century American lawyers